Purpura is a genus of sea snails, marine gastropod mollusks in the subfamily Rapaninae of the family Muricidae, the murex snails or rock snails.

Not to be confused with Purpura Jousseaume, 1880, a synonym of Bolinus Pusch, 1837

Description 
The genus Purpura is characterised by having large shells with large apertures, a concave columella and no external calcitic layer. The rachidian teeth have prominent marginal denticles.

Species
Species within the genus Purpura include:
 Purpura bufo Lamarck, 1822
 Purpura persica (Linnaeus, 1758)
 Purpura panama (Röding, 1798)
 Species brought into synonymy 
 Purpura hippocastanum Lamarck: synonym of Thais (Thalessa) virgata (Dillwyn, 1817) 
 Purpura hystrix Linnaeus: synonym of Drupa (Drupa) ricinus (Linnaeus, 1758)
 Purpura lapillus (Linnaeus, 1758): synonym of Nucella lapillus (Linnaeus, 1758)
 Purpura mancinella (Linnaeus, 1758): synonym of Thais (Mancinella) alouina (Röding, 1798)
 Purpura nassoidea Blainville, 1832: synonym of Oppomorus noduliferus (Menke, 1829)
 Purpura nassoides Quoy & Gaimard, 1833: synonym of Oppomorus noduliferus (Menke, 1829)
 Purpura rudolphi Lamarck, 1822: synonym of Purpura persica (Linnaeus, 1758)

References

 
Muricidae
Gastropod genera